Michael H. Wray (born April 6, 1967) is a Democratic member of the North Carolina House of Representatives. Wray has represented the 27th district (including constituents in Halifax and Northampton counties) since 2005. Wray is also a small business owner in Gaston, North Carolina.

North Carolina House of Representatives
A former Gaston town commissioner, Wray was first elected to the North Carolina House of Representatives in 2004. He has been re-elected a total of 8 times defeating both primary and general election challengers, most recently in 2020.

Wray was a founding member of the North Carolina Legislative Sportsmen's Caucus in 2011 and serves as the group's Democratic Co-Chair in the House. In 2015, Wray became a charter member of the Main Street Democrats Caucus in the North Carolina General Assembly. The Main Street Democrats describe themselves as pro-business, moderate Democrats.

During the 2016 legislative session, Wray was one of 11 Democrats to vote in favor of House Bill 2, the controversial "Bathroom Bill."

Electoral history

2020

2018

2016
Wray was challenged in the Democratic primary by Franklin D. Williams Jr. Wray won the primary and was unopposed in the general election.

2014
Wray was challenged in the Democratic primary by Franklin D. Williams Jr. Wray won the primary and was unopposed in the general election.

2012
Wray was challenged in the May 8, 2012 Democratic primary by James Mills.  Wray won the primary and defeated Libertarian candidate Jesse Shearin in the general election.

2010
Wray was unopposed in the Democratic primary and the general election.

2008
Wray was unopposed in the Democratic primary and the general election.

2006
Wray was challenged in the Democratic primary by Anthony Butler and Howard Ervin. Wray won the primary and was unopposed in the general election.

2004
Wray was one of five candidates to seek the Democratic nomination to fill the vacant District 27 seat in 2004. Other Democratic primary candidates were Richard M. Henderson, Grace M. Edwards, John Soles, and Julius O. Webb. Wray finished second behind Henderson but finished ahead of Henderson in the subsequent runoff election.

Committee assignments

2021-2022 Session
Ethics (Chair)
Finance (Chair)
Agriculture (Vice Chair)
Energy and Public Utilities 
Health 
Insurance 
Rules, Calendar, and Operations of the House

2019-2020 Session
Appropriations 
Appropriations - Agriculture and Natural and Economic Resources 
Ethics (Chair)
Agriculture (Vice Chair)
Energy and Public Utilities 
Health
Insurance 
Rules, Calendar, and Operations of the House

2017-2018 Session
Appropriations
Appropriations - Agriculture and Natural and Economic Resources
Energy and Public Utilities
Health
Insurance
Rules, Calendar, and Operations of the House
Health Care Reform
Wildlife Resources
University Board of Governors Nominating
Transportation

2015-2016 Session
 Appropriations
 Appropriations - Agriculture and Natural and Economic Resources
 Commerce and Job Development (Vice Chair)
 Ethics
 Health
 Insurance
 Public Utilities
 Rules, Calendar, and Operations of the House
 Education - Universities
 Wildlife Resources
 Committee on Chowanoke Nation Recognition (Non-Standing)
 Joint Legislative Commission on Governmental Operations (Non-Standing)
 Joint Legislative Oversight Committee on Health and Human Services (Non-Standing)
 Committee on Land Development (Non-Standing)

2013-2014 Session
Appropriations
Commerce and Job Development
Health and Human Services
Insurance
Public Utilities
Environment

2011-2012 Session
Appropriations
Commerce and Job Development
Health and Human Services
Insurance
Public Utilities

2009-2010 Session
Appropriations
Agriculture
Commerce, Small Business, and Entrepreneurship
Insurance
Transportation
Wildlife Resources

References

External links

 Personal Website for Campaign & News
North Carolina General Assembly - Representative Michael H. Wray official NC House website
Project Vote Smart - Representative Michael H. Wray (NC) profile
Follow the Money - Michael H. Wray
2008 2006 2004 campaign contributions

Living people
1967 births
People from Roanoke Rapids, North Carolina
People from Gaston, North Carolina
Barton College alumni
21st-century American politicians
Democratic Party members of the North Carolina House of Representatives